Maria Guadalupe Henestrosa is an Argentine writer. A trained biologist, she worked as a science journalist. She won the Premio Clarin de Novela in 2002 for her novel Las ingratas, the story of five sisters who migrated from Europe to Argentina in the 1920s.

References

Argentine writers

Living people
Year of birth missing (living people)
Science journalists